is a Paralympian athlete from Japan competing mainly in category T54 sprint events.

Yoshifumi has competed in every Summer Paralympics between 1988 and 2008, normally in the 100m,200m and 400m but in other distances including the 1992 marathon.  His first and so far only medal came as part of the Japanese 4 × 400 m bronze medal-winning team in 2004.

References

Paralympic athletes of Japan
Athletes (track and field) at the 1988 Summer Paralympics
Athletes (track and field) at the 1992 Summer Paralympics
Athletes (track and field) at the 1996 Summer Paralympics
Athletes (track and field) at the 2000 Summer Paralympics
Athletes (track and field) at the 2004 Summer Paralympics
Athletes (track and field) at the 2008 Summer Paralympics
Paralympic bronze medalists for Japan
Living people
Medalists at the 2004 Summer Paralympics
Year of birth missing (living people)
Paralympic medalists in athletics (track and field)
Japanese male wheelchair racers